Woodsville may refer to:

United States
Woodsville, New Hampshire, a census-designated place in Grafton County
Woodsville High School, in the above CDP
Woodsville, New Jersey, an unincorporated community in Mercer County, New Jersey
Woodsville Brook, a tributary of Stony Brook near the above community

Singapore
Woodsville Interchange, a road interchange